Viiv (stylized as V//V)  was a platform initiative from Intel similar to Intel's Centrino and vPro. Initially (through release 1.7), it was a collection of computer technologies with a particular combination of Intel ingredients to support a "media PC" concept.  Intel also provided the Media Server as the core software stack on the PC to support "media" distribution through the home.

Marketing 
Until 2007, Viiv was Intel's attempt to become the center of electronic-based home entertainment. Intel was repeating the marketing model for the very successful Centrino platform, which was their first branded platform. The Intel Viiv brand has been "de-emphasized" and comes after the CPU branding, similar to that of "Core 2 with Viiv inside", putting more focus on the CPU.

There will be no additional releases beyond 1.7.1 of the media server product.

Media discussion

News and reviews 
 PC Pro: behind the badge, conclusive look at Viiv 1.5
 Slashdot: Viiv 1.5 May End Traditional Media PCs
 Engadget: Intel VIIV says no thank you to DRM
 Ars technica:Intel pimps Viiv with a baker's dozen of major partners
 Digitimes: Intel looking to develop Linux version of Viiv to reduce costs

Criticism 
 Bit Tech: Why Intel's DRM strategy is flawed
 Inquirer: Intel Viiv is stupid and broken
 Inquirer: Intel's Viiv is an embarrassment

Intel corporate links 
 Intel's official Viiv (Core2 Processor with Viiv Technology) website

See also 
 Intel Core 2
 Intel vPro
 Centrino
 Vixs

References 

Viiv
Consumer electronics
Intel Viiv